Christopher Grose-Hodge (6 March 1924 – June 1998) was a British fencer. He competed in the team épée at the 1952 Summer Olympics.

References

1924 births
1998 deaths
British male fencers
Olympic fencers of Great Britain
Fencers at the 1952 Summer Olympics